Elmira is a given name. Notable persons with the name include:

Elmira Abdrazakova (born 1994), Russian beauty pageant titleholder
Elmira Alembekova (born 1990), Russian racewalker
Elmira Antommarchi, Colombian poet
Elmira Gafarova (1934–1993), Soviet politician
Elmira Minita Gordon (1930–2021), Governor-General of Belize
Elmira Moldasheva, Kazakhstani ski-orienting competitor
Sarah Elmira Royster (1810–1888), sweetheart of Edgar Allan Poe
Elmira Süleymanova (born 1937), Azerbaijani chemist and civil servant
Elmira Zherzdeva (born 1936), Soviet singer